Sandra Bond Chapman is a cognitive neuroscientist, founder and chief director of the Center for Brain Health, Dee Wyly Distinguished Professor in Brain Health, and a professor in the School of Behavioral and Brain Sciences at The University of Texas at Dallas.

Career

Chapman began her career in the 1970s as a speech pathologist, where she often worked with autistic children with high support needs. During this time, Chapman noticed that several of the children with high support needs were able to solve complex puzzles despite their perceived deficits. This contradiction sparked Chapman's interest in the brain’s potential and modifiability. Chapman founded the Center for Brain Health, a multidisciplinary center housing brain researchers and therapists working collectively to prevent, arrest, and reverse brain traumas. Chapman continues to serve as the chief director.

Research 
Chapman’s cognitive research has laid the theoretical framework and empirical foundation for the development of measurements of higher order reasoning [Test of Strategic Learning] and the development of brain training programs for children and adults. Her research elucidates novel approaches to maximize cognitive function in people with healthy brains as well as those with brain injury, stroke, ADHD, autism, schizophrenia, substance abuse, and progressive brain diseases like Alzheimer's disease.

Chapman's research has resulted in more than 120 publications, nearly 60 funded research grants, and has served as a national public health road for maintaining cognitive fitness and building critical thinking and reasoning skills in adolescents. Chapman was the principal member writing the first state plan for Brain Health fitness for adults. She is a core member for NIH's selection process of central data elements for nationwide clinical trials on acquired brain injury. Throughout her career, Chapman has received major federal, state, and private research support to advance the treatment of veterans, sports-related brain injuries, concussions, autism, schizophrenia, adolescent reasoning, and brain development, among others.

Education 
Chapman received her B.A. (in Speech Pathology) and M.A. (in Communication Disorders) from the University of North Texas. Her Ph.D. in Communication Disorders is from University of Texas at Dallas.

Memberships 
Chapman is a member of the following organizations:
Academy of Aphasia
Academy of Neurologic Communication Disorders & Sciences
Alzheimer’s disease and Related Disorders Association, Inc.
American Association for the Advancement of Science
American Speech Language and Hearing Association
American Society of Aging
American Speech-Language-Hearing Association
A.W.A.R.E. (The Association of Women for Alzheimer’s Research and Education)
Charter 100 Member
Cognitive Neuroscience Society
Communities Foundation of Texas Designated Fund (CFT) Advisory Committee
The Dallas Assembly
Dallas NanoSystems Technical Advisory Board
Gerontological Society of America
International Neuropsychological Society
International Women’s Forum Member
National Aphasia Association, Regional Representative
The Sarah Jane Brain Foundation National Advisory Board
Society for Experimental Biology and Medicine Council
Society for Neuroscience
Texas Council for Alzheimer’s, Advisory Board Task Force
Texas Speech and Hearing Association

References

External links
 Center for BrainH Heath 

University of Texas at Dallas
People from Dallas
American founders
Speech and language pathologists